Garbis İstanbulluoğlu  (24 February 192717 February 1994), known as with his given nickname Tenekeci Gabris, - literally meaning "Tinsmith",  was a former Turkish football player and coach.

Early life
Of Armenian origin, he was born in Kadırga neighbourhood of Fatih, Istanbul. His father was a tinsmith and Garbis was called "Tenekeci Garbis", by fans and the press, because of his father's profession (Tenekeci is Turkish for tinsmith).

Career
İstanbulluoğlu began playing football with Kadırgaspor, his local team.  He joined Vefa S.K. in 1950, where he played in 90 games scoring 52 goals.  He also played for Taksim SK for three seasons.  He played as a striker.

National Team
İstanbulluoğlu was the first  Armenian origin footballer that represented Turkey.  He was first capped for Turkey on 1 June 1952 in Ankara against Switzerland, scoring in his debut. He was capped by Turkey for four times, scoring three goals.  He also played for Turkey against Italy (B) side on 11 December 1953 in Istanbul.  However, this game is not considered an official game for FIFA.

Coaching
Started his managerial career with Taksim SK.  In the 1967–68 season he was assistant manager of Mehmet Ali Has when Taksim SK at the Turkish 2. Division.  Following year, he was appointed to as a technical director (manager) of Taksim SK until 1974 when the team relegated to Amateur League from Turkish 3. Division.  He was also manager of Şişli SK.  Both teams represented the Armenian community in Istanbul.

Death
İstanbulluoğlu died on 17 February 1994 in Istanbul and buried in Şişli Armenian Cemetery.

Statistics

Club

International

References

External links
 Footballer profile at TFF

Armenian footballers
Ethnic Armenian sportspeople
Turkish footballers
Turkey international footballers
Turkish people of Armenian descent
1927 births
1994 deaths
Footballers from Istanbul
Association football forwards
Burials at Şişli Armenian Cemetery